Sparta is a city in and the county seat of White County, Tennessee, United States. The population was 5,001 in 2020.

The Calfkiller River flows through the city. Seven sites in Sparta are listed on the National Register of Historic Places.

History 

Sparta was established in 1809 as a county seat for White County, which had been created in 1806. The city was named after the ancient Greek city-state Sparta.  

Sparta nearly became the capital of the state of Tennessee, as, early in the history of Tennessee, the state legislature voted to choose a location for the permanent state capital. The final vote resulted in a near tie between Sparta and Nashville. Sparta lost to Nashville by one vote.

Sparta grew quickly due to its location along the stage road between Knoxville and Nashville. In the 1830s, brothers Barlow and Madison Fisk built the Sparta Rock House, which served as an inn along the stage road. The Rock House, strategically situated in an area where the Cumberland Plateau gives way to the Calfkiller valley, was a common stopover for figures important to the early history of the state, including Andrew Jackson and Sam Houston. The building is now a state historic site and is listed on the National Register of Historic Places.

Sparta is notable as a place where two renowned airmen lost their lives. Hawthorne C. Gray, an aviation record holder, died in a balloon-basket mishap over Sparta in 1927, and Lansing Colton Holden Jr., a World War I flying ace, crashed his plane near Sparta in 1938.

Teenagers Erin Foster and Jeremy Bechtel went missing in Sparta in 2000, and were not discovered until February 2022 when scuba diver Jeremy Sides found Foster's vehicle in the Calfkiller River.

Geography
Sparta is located at  (35.932335, -85.469837), approximately fifteen miles south of Cookeville. The city is situated on the Highland Rim, near the western base of the Cumberland Plateau. The Calfkiller River traverses Sparta north-to-south en route to its confluence with the Caney Fork several miles to the south.

Sparta is traditionally concentrated around its courthouse square along U.S. Route 70 (signed locally as Bockman Way), which connects Sparta with Crossville to the east and Smithville to the west. State Route 111, which traverses the western part of Sparta, connects the city with Cookeville to the north and Spencer to the south. A modern commercial area has developed around the intersection of US 70 and SR 111. State Route 84 winds its away up the Calfkiller Valley, connecting Sparta with Monterey atop the Plateau to the northeast. U.S. Route 70S connects Sparta with McMinnville to the southwest.

Climate
Sparta's climate is humid subtropical (Cfa) under the Köppen system, with mild winters and hot, humid summers. Under the Trewartha system, it is a borderline humid subtropical (Cf) and oceanic (Do) climate, supported by the fact that subtropical plants like Southern Magnolia and the occasional Needle Palm can reach their full potential here but struggle much further north.

Demographics

2020 census

As of the 2020 United States census, there were 5,001 people, 1,697 households, and 1,035 families residing in the city.

2000 census
As of the census of 2000, there were 4,599 people, 1,952 households, and 1,270 families residing in the city. The population density was 725.2 people per square mile (280.1/km2). There were 2,192 housing units at an average density of 345.7 per square mile (133.5/km2). The racial makeup of the city was 91.82% White, 5.28% African American, 0.20% Native American, 0.65% Asian, 0.13% Pacific Islander, 0.67% from other races, and 1.24% from two or more races. Hispanic or Latino of any race were 1.15% of the population.

There were 1,952 households, out of which 27.6% had children under the age of 18 living with them, 43.7% were married couples living together, 17.6% had a female householder with no husband present, and 34.9% were non-families. 32.8% of all households were made up of individuals, and 17.9% had someone living alone who was 65 years of age or older. The average household size was 2.24 and the average family size was 2.81.

In the city, the population was spread out, with 21.8% under the age of 18, 7.7% from 18 to 24, 25.0% from 25 to 44, 22.9% from 45 to 64, and 22.5% who were 65 years of age or older. The median age was 41 years. For every 100 females, there were 85.1 males. For every 100 females age 18 and over, there were 77.7 males.

The median income for a household in the city was $23,775, and the median income for a family was $33,060. Males had a median income of $26,970 versus $20,295 for females. The per capita income for the city was $15,340. About 16.2% of families and 21.3% of the population were below the poverty line, including 30.3% of those under age 18 and 14.3% of those age 65 or over.

Notable people 

 Foster V. Brown, U.S. Congressman
 David Culley, NFL coach
 John D. Defrees, newspaperman and politician
 George Gibbs Dibrell, Civil War general (Confederate) and U.S. Congressman
 Lester Flatt, bluegrass musician in the Foggy Mountain Boys
 John C. Floyd, U.S. Congressman 
 Erin Foster and Jeremy Bechtel, Missing teenagers
 Erasmus Lee Gardenhire, politician and judge who served in the Confederate States Congress and Tennessee House of Representatives; lived his adult life in Sparta
 Kellie Harper, head coach of the Tennessee Lady Vols basketball team; grew up in Sparta
 Benny Martin, bluegrass musician who invented the eight string fiddle
 Ethan Roberts, Major League Baseball pitcher
 Tom Rogers, Major League Baseball pitcher
 Charles Edward Snodgrass, U.S. Congressman; uncle of Henry C. Snodgrass
 Henry C. Snodgrass, U.S. Congressman
 Lefty Stewart, Major League Baseball pitcher
 James W. Throckmorton, 12th Governor of Texas and U.S. Congressman
 Earl Webb, Major League Baseball outfielder

References

External links

 City of Sparta - Official Website
 Sparta - White County Chamber of Commerce
 White County High School
 White County Sheriff's Office
 Sparta Expositor Official Site
 White County Elections Office

Cities in Tennessee
Cities in White County, Tennessee
County seats in Tennessee
Populated places established in 1809
1809 establishments in Tennessee